Incrupila is a genus of fungi within the Hyaloscyphaceae family. The genus contains 10 species.

References

External links
Incrupila at Index Fungorum

Hyaloscyphaceae